The 2018 WNBA season is the 22nd season for the New York Liberty franchise of the WNBA. The season tips off on May 20. During the off-season the Liberty hired Katie Smith as head coach.  Smith replaced Bill Laimbeer, who left to coach the Las Vegas Aces.  It was also announced in the offseason that the team would play its home games at the Westchester County Center.

The 2018 season ended up being a difficult one for the Liberty. After having achieved a 22-win season in 2017, the team could only muster 7 wins in 2018.  The team started 1–2 in May, but quickly fell behind the playoff pace going 3–9 in June.  Things did not improve in July when the team went 3–7.  The team finished the season on a thirteen-game losing streak, including an 0–9 August to finish the season 7–27.  This was the franchise's worst record in its history.  The previous worst was 11–23 in 2013.

Transactions

WNBA Draft

Trades/Roster Changes

Current roster

Game log

Pre-season

|- style="background:#fcc;"
| 1
| May 7
| vs. Dallas
| L 69–76
| Coleman (14)
| Tied (4)
| Zellous (4)
| Mohegan Sun Arena 
| 0–1
|- style="background:#bbffbb;"
| 2
| May 8
| vs. Los Angeles
| W 81–75
| Nurse (19)
| Gray (14)
| 4 Tied (3)
| Mohegan Sun Arena1,106
| 1–1

Regular season

|- style="background:#fcc;"
| 1
| May 20
| @ Chicago
| L 76–80
| Charles (19)
| Zahui B. (7)
| Hartley (6)
| Wintrust Arena7,922
| 0–1
|- style="background:#fcc;"
| 2
| May 25
| Minnesota
| L 72–78
| Charles (18)
| Charles (12)
| Hartley (3)
| Westchester County Center2,315
| 0–2
|- style="background:#bbffbb;"
| 3
| May 29
| Dallas
| W 94–89
| Charles (34)
| Charles (10)
| Zellous (9)
| Westchester County Center1,516
| 1–2

|- style="background:#bbffbb;"
| 4
| June 2
| @ Indiana
| W 87–81
| Nurse (34)
| Stokes (12)
| Tied (4)
| Bankers Life Fieldhouse5,575
| 2–2
|- style="background:#fcc;"
| 5
| June 5
| Phoenix
| L 74–80
| Charles (25)
| Tied (8)
| Hartley (5)
| Madison Square Garden7,215
| 2–3
|- style="background:#fcc;"
| 6
| June 7
| Connecticut
| L 86–88
| Charles (24)
| Charles (9)
| Zellous (7)
| Westchester County Center1,581
| 2–4
|- style="background:#bbffbb;"
| 7
| June 10
| Indiana
| W 78–75
| Rodgers (16)
| Tied (4)
| 4 Tied (3)
| Westchester County Center1,537
| 3–4
|- style="background:#fcc;"
| 8
| June 13
| Las Vegas
| L 63–78
| Charles (19)
| Coleman (5)
| Coleman (5)
| Westchester County Center1,419
| 3–5
|- style="background:#fcc;"
| 9
| June 16
| @ Minnesota
| L 71–85
| Charles (12)
| Tied (4)
| Hartley (6)
| Target Center9,114
| 3–6
|- style="background:#bbffbb;"
| 10
| June 19
| Atlanta
| W 79–72
| Charles (29)
| Vaughn (9)
| Boyd (11)
| Westchester County Center1,627
| 4–6
|- style="background:#fcc;"
| 11
| June 22
| @ Las Vegas
| L 78–88
| Tied (14)
| Charles (8)
| 3 Tied (5)
| Mandalay Bay Events Center5,478
| 4–7
|- style="background:#fcc;"
| 12
| June 24
| @ Los Angeles
| 54–80
| Zahui B (21)
| Boyd (6)
| Boyd (8)
| Staples Center9,203
| 4–8
|- style="background:#fcc;"
| 13
| June 26
| Phoenix
| L 69–83
| Charles (12)
| Charles (8)
| Boyd (7)
| Westchester County Center1,839
| 4–9
|- style="background:#fcc;"
| 14
| June 28
| @ Washington
| L 77–80
| Prince (21)
| Charles (7)
| Charles (6)
| Capital One Arena4,473
| 4–10
|- style="background:#fcc;"
| 15
| June 29
| Chicago
| L 99–103
| Charles (24)
| Stokes (5)
| Prince (5)
| Westchester County Center1,837
| 4–11

|- style="background:#bbffbb;"
| 16
| July 1
| @ Chicago
| W 97–94 (OT)
| Charles (28)
| Vaughn (11)
| Boyd (5)
| Wintrust Arena5,382
| 5–11
|- style="background:#fcc;"
| 17
| July 3
| Seattle
| L 62–77
| Hartley (16)
| Zellous (7)
| 3 Tied (4)
| Westchester County Center1,749
| 5–12
|- style="background:#fcc;"
| 18
| July 5
| @ Washington
| L 67–86
| Charles (26)
| Charles (12)
| Hartley (7)
| Capital One Arena4,674
| 5–13
|- style="background:#fcc;"
| 19
| July 8
| Dallas
| L 87–97
| Charles (26)
| Charles (9)
| Boyd (5)
| Westchester County Center1,719
| 5–14
|- style="background:#bbffbb;"
| 20
| July 11
| @ Connecticut
| W 79–76
| Charles (19)
| Charles (11)
| Boyd (8)
| Mohegan Sun Arena7,413
| 6–14
|- style="background:#bbffbb;"
| 21
| July 15
| Chicago
| W 107–84
| Charles (21)
| Vaughn (7)
| Boyd (10)
| Westchester County Center2,073
| 7–14
|- style="background:#fcc;"
| 22
| July 17
| @ Dallas
| L 87–104
| Nurse (25)
| Charles (6)
| Tied (4)
| College Park Center6,459
| 7–15
|- style="background:#fcc;"
| 23
| July 19
| @ Atlanta
| L 68–82
| Charles (11)
| Boyd (7)
| Boyd (10)
| McCamish Pavilion3,074
| 7–16
|- style="background:#fcc;"
| 24
| July 21
| Washington
| L 78–95
| Charles (22)
| Charles (5)
| Hartley (6)
| Westchester County Center2,005
| 7–17
|- style="background:#fcc;"
| 25
| July 24
| @ Minnesota
| L 82–85
| Charles (32)
| Charles (15)
| Boyd (9)
| Target Center9,830
| 7–18

|- style="background:#fcc;"
| 26
| August 1
| @ Connecticut
| L 77–92
| Rodgers (16)
| Vaughn (7)
| Boyd (8)
| Mohegan Sun Arena6,412
| 7–19
|- style="background:#fcc;"
| 27
| August 4
| Indiana
| L 55–68
| Charles (11)
| Charles (10)
| Charles (4)
| Westchester County Center2,225
| 7–20
|- style="background:#fcc;"
| 28
| August 6
| Seattle
| L 80–96
| Tied (20)
| Zahui B. (11)
| Boyd (7)
| Madison Square Garden12,488
| 7–21
|- style="background:#fcc;"
| 29
| August 8
| Los Angeles
| L 81–82
| Charles (27)
| Stokes (11)
| Boyd (7)
| Westchester County Center2,481
| 7–22
|- style="background:#fcc;"
| 30
| August 12
| Atlanta
| L 77–86
| Charles (26)
| Stokes (10)
| Charles (5)
| Westchester County Center2,362
| 7–23
|- style="background:#fcc;"
| 21
| August 14
| @ Los Angeles
| L 66–74
| Charles (21)
| Vaughn (8)
| Tied (4)
| Staples Center11,067
| 7–24
|- style="background:#fcc;"
| 32
| August 15
| @ Las Vegas
| L 72–85
| Tied (14)
| Stokes (11)
| Boyd (6)
| Mandalay Bay Events Center7,159
| 7–25
|- style="background:#fcc;"
| 33
| August 17
| @ Seattle
| L 77–85
| Charles (21)
| Stokes (15)
| Boyd (5)
| KeyArena10,873
| 7–26
|- style="background:#fcc;"
| 34
| August 19
| @ Phoenix
| L 85–96
| Nurse (28)
| Stokes (9)
| Boyd (7)
| Talking Stick Resort Arena13,106
| 7–27

Standings

Statistics

Regular season

Awards and honors

References

External links
The Official Site of the New York Liberty

New York Liberty seasons
New York Liberty